Rock Around the Clock is the third album of rock and roll music by Bill Haley and His Comets. Released by Decca Records in December 1955 it was, like the two albums that preceded it, a compilation album of previously issued singles. All of the album's contents had in fact been previously issued by Decca earlier in 1955 on the album Shake, Rattle and Roll. Unlike the previous release, which was in the 10-inch format, the new album was a full 12-inch release and included additional tracks from 1955. It was also the first Haley album to make the Billboard charts, and was one of the first album releases of the rock and roll genre to do so.

Some non-American releases of the album, such as that on the Festival Records label of Australia on FR12-1102, promoted the album as being the soundtrack for the Rock Around the Clock film, owing to six of its tracks being included in the film.

The album was recorded in the Decca Records studio located in the Pythian Temple in New York City.

Track listing

Personnel
 Bill Haley – rhythm guitar, vocals
 Danny Cedrone – lead guitar on 1-4
 Franny Beecher – lead guitar on 5-12
 Billy Williamson – steel guitar
 Johnny Grande – piano
 Marshall Lytle – double bass on 1-10
 Billy Gussak – drums on 1-8
 Joey Ambrose – tenor saxophone on 1-10

Additional personnel
 Al Rex – double bass on 11, 12
 Cliff Leeman – drums on 9-12
 Rudy Pompilli – tenor saxophone on 11, 12
 Dick Richards - triangle on 3; tom toms on 9; backing vocals on 2, 5, 6

Charts
Album

Single

Re-issue
The recording was re-issued on 180 Gram vinyl in 2009 by Doxy Music it was manufactured in Europe. Catalogue #DOY613

References

Bill Haley & His Comets albums
Albums produced by Milt Gabler
1955 compilation albums
Decca Records compilation albums